Sonoseki Dam  is a gravity dam located in Miyagi Prefecture in Japan. The dam is used for flood control and water supply. The catchment area of the dam is 3.8 km2. The dam impounds about 17  ha of land when full and can store 1100 thousand cubic meters of water. The construction of the dam was started on 1988 and completed in 1999.

See also
List of dams in Japan

References

Dams in Miyagi Prefecture